The 1916 Michigan gubernatorial election was held on November 7, 1916. Republican nominee Albert Sleeper defeated Democratic nominee Edwin F. Sweet with 55.83% of the vote.

General election

Candidates
Major party candidates
Albert Sleeper, Republican
Edwin F. Sweet, Democratic 
Other candidates
Ernest J. Moore, Socialist
E. W. Woodruff, Prohibition
James R. Murray, Socialist Labor
Henry R. Pattengill, Progressive
Frank Durfee, Unaffiliated

Results

References

1916
Michigan
Gubernatorial
November 1916 events